is a Buddhist temple of the Nichiren sect in Gifu, Gifu Prefecture, Japan. Its formal name is Shūrinzan Jōzai-ji (鷲林山常在寺). Starting with Saitō Dōsan, Jōzai-ji served as the family temple for the Saitō family for three generations, which included his son, Saitō Yoshitatsu, and his grandson, Saitō Tokugen. Also, it has been designated as a nationally Important Cultural Property, as it contains pictures of both Dōsan and Yoshitatsu.

History
In 1450, Saitō Myōchin served as the guardian of upper Mino Province on behalf of the Toki clan. (Myōchin was the son of Saitō Sōen, who had earlier served as the guardian of Mino Province.) Using his power in the area, he built this temple.

Afterwards, as Japan entered the Sengoku period, Nagai Shinzaemon used the area around his temple as his base for uniting the region. Dōsan, his son, continued his father's base of operations for a second generation, designating Jōzai-ji the family temple.

See also 
 For an explanation of terms concerning Japanese Buddhism, Japanese Buddhist art, and Japanese Buddhist temple architecture, see the Glossary of Japanese Buddhism.

External links

Images 

Buildings and structures in Gifu
Buddhist temples in Gifu Prefecture
Nichiren-shū temples